Revive or Revived may refer to:
Revival, especially bringing back to life
Revive (video gaming), resurrecting a defeated character.

Music
 Revive (band), a Christian rock band
 Revive, classical album by Elīna Garanča 2016
 Revive, studio album by Nemophila 2021
 Revive (Brown Eyed Girls album)
 Revive (Steadman album)
 "Revive (Say Something)", song by LuvBug
 "Puzzle/Revive", a double A-side single by Mai Kuraki

Products 
 Revive, a flavor of Vitamin Water
 7 UP Revive, a flavor of 7 Up
 Revive Adserver

See also
 Reviver (disambiguation)